M. Cravath Simpson (December 6, 1860 – May 19, 1945) was an African-American activist and public speaker. After beginning her career as a singer, she studied to become a podiatrist, but is most known for her work to uplift the black community and combat lynching. Though she was based in Boston, Simpson spoke throughout the Northeastern and Midwestern United States urging recognition of the human rights of black citizens.

Early life
Mary Mahala Cravat, known as Minnie, was born on December 6, 1860 in Cumberland, Providence County, Rhode Island to Sarah B. (née Eldridge) and John A. Cravat. She was the youngest of three siblings, which included a brother, Eldridge and sister Clara. Her father was a mulatto, who was born in Pennsylvania to a French father. His profession was a barber, but he served in Company A, Regiment 11 of the Union Army's Colored Heavy Artillery Unit from August 10, 1863, to October 2, 1865. After completing high school in Rhode Island, Cravat married Charles Harry Simpson on October 30, 1882, in Providence and moved to Boston. Continuing her studies she trained as a contralto for the next seven years.

Career
Simpson made her debut as a singer in 1891 and before retiring from singing in 1895, performed at Madison Square Garden. When she left performing, Simpson turned to a career in public speaking and simultaneously continued her education at the Boston College of Chiropody, graduating as a chiropodist in 1911. From 1903 to 1940, she spoke throughout the Northeastern Seaboard and Midwest, giving talks on lynching and racial inequality.

In addition to her business career, Simpson was an active clubwoman, involved in the founding of such organizations as the Woman's Era Club (1892), for which she was secretary for 14 years and the Harriet Tubman House (1903). The Era Club and its founder, Josephine St. Pierre Ruffin, urged the formation of the National Association of Colored Women, which Simpson joined at its formation in 1896. That same year, when the Northeastern Federation of Women's Clubs (1896), was founded Simpson became a member and chaired the anti-lynching committee. She would become chair of the Federation in 1918.

When William Monroe Trotter formed the Negro-American Political League in 1908 and split from the NAACP over whether the association should be black-led or allow whites to head and participate in the organization, Simpson, along with Pauline Hopkins, Rev. Matthew A. N. Shaw, and Ida B. Wells, among others, supported and assisted in the endeavor. She was president of the Anti-Lynching Society of Afro-American Women, which formed around 1911, and led the creation effort of the Massachusetts State Union of Black Women's Clubs (1914), acting as its inaugural president from 1914 to 1916 and serving again from 1922 to 1924. In her various roles, she worked to protect the human rights and insure respect, equality and justice for African Americans.

Death and legacy
In February 1945, Simpson's apartment building caught fire and she was hospitalized for shock. She died three months later on May 19, 1945, in Boston. In 1968, she was listed by The Boston Globe as one of the "Black Brahmins" of Boston, "a remarkable lot, [who] though not revolutionaries themselves, they tilled the ground and prepared the way" for the Civil Rights Movement.

References

Citations

Bibliography

 

 
  

 
 
  
  and  
  

  
  
  
 

1860 births
1945 deaths
People from Cumberland, Rhode Island
African-American activists
19th-century African-American women singers
American podiatrists
American civil rights activists
Clubwomen
American people of French descent
Women civil rights activists
20th-century African-American women
20th-century African-American people